Eukrate (minor planet designation: 247 Eukrate) is a rather large main-belt asteroid. It is dark and probably a primitive carbonaceous body. The asteroid was discovered by Robert Luther on March 14, 1885, in Düsseldorf. It was named after Eucrate, a Nereid in Greek mythology.

In 2001, the asteroid was detected by radar from the Arecibo Observatory at a distance of 1.18 AU.

There have been 9 occultation observations of this asteroid since 2004.  The latest of 2018 May 12 was a 5 chord observation that allows, using Occult (Software), the scaling of the DAMIT model 1207, to yield a Mean volume-equivalent diameter of 137.5km and a Mean surface-equivalent diameter of 140.0 km.

References

External links
 The Asteroid Orbital Elements Database
 Minor Planet Discovery Circumstances
 Asteroid Lightcurve Data File
 
 

Background asteroids
Eukrate
Eukrate
CP-type asteroids (Tholen)
Xc-type asteroids (SMASS)
18850314
Objects observed by stellar occultation